Gloria Chinasa Okoro (born 8 December 1987), known as Gloria Chinasa, is a footballer who plays as a forward. Born in Nigeria, she has played for Equatorial Guinea.

Club career
Chinasa was born and raised in Nigeria. She began her career in Port Harcourt-based club Rivers Angels. In 2005, she played a match against an Equatorial Guinean club and scored three goals. After that, she received a proposal to play for the Equatorial Guinea women's national team, and she accepted.

Chinasa played the 2011 World Cup, where she was a starting player in the 3–2 loss to Australia.

Following the World Cup Chinasa signed for Polish champion Unia Racibórz. She scored the team's only goal in the 2011–12 Champions League qualifying stage match against Pallokerho-35.

On 28 October 2006, Chinasa scored the first goal in history for Equatorial Guinea on African Women's Championship. She also became African Champion on tournaments held in 2008 and 2012.

International goals
Scores and results list Equatorial Guinea's goal tally first

Honors and awards

Clubs
Estrellas de E'Waiso Ipola
Liga Nacional de Fútbol Femenino: 2018

National team
Equatorial Guinea
Africa Women Cup of Nations: 2008, 2012

References

External links

1987 births
Living people
Footballers from Enugu
Nigerian women's footballers
Women's association football forwards
Rivers Angels F.C. players
RTP Unia Racibórz players
Gintra Universitetas players
Bobruichanka Bobruisk players
KFF Vllaznia Shkodër players
Igbo sportspeople
Nigerian expatriate women's footballers
Nigerian expatriate sportspeople in Poland
Expatriate women's footballers in Poland
Nigerian expatriate sportspeople in Lithuania
Expatriate women's footballers in Lithuania
Nigerian expatriate sportspeople in Belarus
Expatriate women's footballers in Belarus
Nigerian expatriate sportspeople in Albania
Expatriate footballers in Albania
Nigerian expatriate sportspeople in France
Expatriate women's footballers in France
Nigerian emigrants to Equatorial Guinea
Naturalized citizens of Equatorial Guinea
Equatoguinean women's footballers
Equatorial Guinea women's international footballers
2011 FIFA Women's World Cup players
Equatoguinean people of Nigerian descent